AFR may refer to:

 AFR (film), a 2007 film
 Afrikaans language, ISO-639 code
 Air France, ICAO code
 Air–fuel ratio, an engineering term.
 Armed Forces Radio, original name of American Forces Network
 Alternate frame rendering, a computer term
 American Family Radio, a network of radio stations in US
 American Film Renaissance, a US film institute
 American flag rugby, a variant of Rugby Union
 Americans for Financial Reform, an organisation in US
 Annualized failure rate, a measure of reliability
 Annual Financial Report
 Arbel Fauvet Rail, a French rolling stock manufacturer
 Australian Financial Review, a business newspaper
 Automatic facial recognition, also known as live facial recognition
 A short form for the continent of Africa.